The Mahia electorate was created in 1996 for the first MMP election. Located on the East Cape, it existed for one term only.

Population centres
The 1996 election was notable for the significant change of electorate boundaries, based on the provisions of the Electoral Act 1993. Because of the introduction of the mixed-member proportional (MMP) electoral system, the number of electorates had to be reduced, leading to significant changes. More than half of the electorates contested in 1996 were newly constituted, and most of the remainder had seen significant boundary changes. In total, 73 electorates were abolished, 29 electorates were newly created (including Mahia), and 10 electorates were recreated, giving a net loss of 34 electorates.

electorates.

History
Mahia only existed as such for one term and was represented by Labour MP Janet Mackey, who had previously represented Gisborne.

Members of Parliament
Key

Election results

1996 election

References

Historical electorates of New Zealand
1996 establishments in New Zealand
1999 disestablishments in New Zealand